Sthalasayana Perumal Temple may refer to:

Sthalasayana Perumal Temple, Tirusirupuliyur, a temple in Thirusirupuliyur, Nagapattinam district, Tamil Nadu, India
Sthalasayana Perumal Temple, Mahabalipuram, a temple in Mahabalipuram, Kanchipuram district, Tamil Nadu, India